Dolichandrone falcata is a small deciduous tree in the family Bignoniaceae. It is endemic to India.
Tree attains a height of 15–20 feet. Leaves are compound 2-6 inches long with  3-6 obovate or oval shaped leaflets. Flowers are white  and fragrant. Flowering occurs in April–May.

References

External links

 Pharmacographia India page 40
 Compendium of medicinal plants By Niir Board

falcata